Introduction, The Introduction, Intro, or The Intro may refer to:

General use
 Introduction (music), an opening section of a piece of music
 Introduction (writing), a beginning section to a book, article or essay which states its purpose and goals 
 Foreword, a beginning section
 Introduction (British House of Commons), a ceremonial seating for members elected in by-elections
 Introduction (House of Lords), a ceremonial seating for some new members
 Intro (demoscene), in the demoscene, a short computer program produced for promotion or to meet competition requirements
 Introduced species or introduction, a species established by humans outside its natural range
 Right of initiative (legislative), the ability of an entity to introduce a bill or other proposed legislation before a Legislature.
 Product launch, the introduction of a new product to market

Music

Performers
Intro (R&B group), an American R&B trio
Introduction (rock band), a Swedish rock group

Albums
Introduction (Alex Parks album), 2003
Introduction (Confide album), 2006
Introduction (Marty Friedman album), 1994
Introduction (Red Krayola album), 2006
Introduction, an album by Larry Heard
The Introduction (album), by the Steve Morse Band
Intro (Bravo Band album), 2008
Intro (Danny Fernandes album)
Intro (Ich Troje album)
Intro – The Gift Recordings, album by Pulp
The Intro (Ruth B EP), 2015
 No Introduction, album by Tyga

Songs and tracks
"Intro" (DaBaby song)
"Intro" (The xx song)
"Introduction", by Chicago from The Chicago Transit Authority
"Introduction", by Celine Dion from Celine Dion
"Introduction", by Hood from Outside Closer
"Introduction", by Kajagoogoo from White Feathers
"Introduction", by Mike Oldfield from Tubular Bells 2003
"Introduction 2003", the single version of the album track
"Introduction", by Tig Notaro from Good One
"Introduction", by Panic! at the Disco from A Fever You Can't Sweat Out
"Introduction", by Quasi from The Sword of God
"Introduction", by Texas in July from I Am
"Introduction", by Texas in July from One Reality
"Introduction", by James Gang from Yer' Album
"Intro", by Aaliyah from Age Ain't Nothing but a Number
"Intro", by Aerosmith from Get a Grip
"Intro", by Alan Braxe & Fred Falke from The Upper Cuts
"Intro", by All That Remains from A War You Cannot Win
"Intro", by Annie from Anniemal
"Intro", by Ariana Grande from My Everything
"Intro", by Ariana Grande from Christmas & Chill
"Intro", by Ashley Tisdale from Headstrong
"Intro", by Bad Gyal from Worldwide Angel
"Intro", by Big Sean from I Decided
"Intro", by Black Country, New Road from Ants from Up There
"Intro", by Bloodbath from The Wacken Carnage
"Intro", by Blur from No Distance Left to Run (Bonus DVD)
"Intro", by Brandy from Never Say Never
"Intro", by Bullet for My Valentine from The Poison
"Intro", by Carnifex from Dead in My Arms
"Intro", by Cheryl Cole from Only Human
"Intro", by Chromeo from Fancy Footwork
"Intro", by Darkane from Rusted Angel
"Intro", by DC Talk from Supernatural
"Intro", by De La Soul from 3 Feet High and Rising
"Intro", by De La Soul from AOI: Bionix
"Intro", by Demi Lovato from Dancing with the Devil... the Art of Starting Over
"Intro", by DJ Kay Slay featuring Aaron Hall from The Streetsweeper, Vol. 1
"Intro", by DJ Kay Slay featuring Busta Rhymes from More Than Just a DJ
"Intro" and "The Introduction", both by DJ Kay Slay and Greg Street from The Champions: North Meets South
"Intro", by Drake Bell from Telegraph
"Intro", by Dreamcatcher
"Intro", by Ellie Goulding from Delirium
"Intro", by Framing Hanley from A Promise to Burn
"Intro", by Girls Aloud from Chemistry
"Intro", by Gorillaz from Demon Days
"Intro", by Gwar from Beyond Hell
"Intro", by Hammer from The Funky Headhunter
"Intro", by The Haunted from Live Rounds in Tokyo
"Intro", by Hieroglyphics from 3rd Eye Vision
"Intro", by In Fear and Faith from Your World on Fire
"Intro", by Jay-Z from American Gangster
"Intro", by Kelis from Flesh Tone
"Intro", by Kelis from Kaleidoscope
"Intro", by Kelis from Kelis Was Here
"Intro", by Kelis from Tasty
"Intro", by Kelis from Wanderland
"Intro", by Korn from Untitled Korn album
"Intro", by Kurupt from Against the Grain
"Intro", by Kurupt from Streetlights
"Intro", by Lauren Jauregui from Prelude
"Intro", by LL Cool J from 10
"Intro", by Logic from Under Pressure
"Intro", by Ludacris from The Red Light District
"Intro", by Ludacris from Theater of the Mind
"Intro", by Lupe Fiasco from Lupe Fiasco's Food & Liquor
"Intro", by M83 from Hurry Up, We're Dreaming
"Intro", by MC Breed from It's All Good
"Intro", by Misia from Marvelous
"Intro", by Mobb Deep from Juvenile Hell
"Intro", by Muse from Absolution
"Intro", by Muse from HAARP
"Intro", by The Notorious B.I.G. from Ready to Die
"Intro", by N.E.R.D from In Search of...
"Intro", by The Offspring from Conspiracy of One
"Intro", by Paradise Lost from Lost Paradise
"Intro", by Pitbull from El Mariel
"Intro", by Prodigy from Hegelian Dialectic (The Book of Revelation)
"Intro", by Queen from A Day at the Races (part of track 1 and only listed separately on CD)
"Intro", by Refused from This Just Might Be... the Truth
"Intro", by Reks from REBELutionary
"Intro", by Roll Deep from Winner Stays On
"Intro", by Royce da 5'9" from Death Is Certain
"Intro", by Royce da 5'9" from Independent's Day
"Intro", by Serj Tankian and Arto Tunçboyacıyan from Serart
"Intro", by Snoop Dogg from 220
"Intro", by Staind from 14 Shades of Grey
"Intro", by Sum 41 from Chuck
"Intro", by Tinie Tempah from Disc-Overy
"Intro", by Wizzard from Introducing Eddy and the Falcons
"Intro", by Yung Beef from ADROMICFMS 4
"Intro (The Warm Up)", a song by J. Cole from The Warm Up
"The Intro", by LL Cool J from Mr. Smith

Other titled works
"Introduction" (Blake, 1794), a poem by William Blake
 The Introduction, a prequel film of the video game Grand Theft Auto: San Andreas

Science 
Introduced species, A species living outside its native distributional range

See also
 
 
 Introducing (disambiguation)
 Outro (disambiguation)
Title sequence (also referred to as an intro), the introductory sequence of a film or television program
Timelines, that show when things where first introduced
:Category:Debuts, for things that were debuted (and introduced)